Baba (Serbian Cyrillic: Баба) is a mountain in central Serbia, east of the city of Paraćin. It has an elevation of 657 metres above sea level.

At the northern edge of the mountain, there is Orthodox monastery Lešje from 14th century.

References

External links

Website of village of Plana

Mountains of Serbia